The Treaty of Cateau-Cambrésis or Peace of Cateau-Cambrésis in April 1559 ended the Italian War of 1551–1559, the last of the Italian Wars (1494–1559). It consisted of several separate treaties, the main two signed on 2 April by Elizabeth I of England and Henry II of France, and on 3 April between Henry and Philip II of Spain. Although he was not a signatory, the agreements were approved by Emperor Ferdinand I, since many of the territorial exchanges concerned states that were part of the Holy Roman Empire.

Habsburg Spain was left sovereign over half of Italy, namely the southern kingdoms of Naples, Sicily, Sardinia and the Duchy of Milan in the north, territories it retained until the end of the 17th century, while France strengthened its southern and eastern borders and confirmed the recapture of Calais from England. In exchange, France abandoned its claim to the Duchy of Milan, restored an independent Savoy, returned Corsica to the Republic of Genoa and recognised Elizabeth I as queen of England, rather than Mary, Queen of Scots.

Background

The Italian Wars between Valois France and the Habsburg Empire began in 1494 and with intermittent breaks lasted for over 60 years. For much of this period, both Spain and the Holy Roman Empire were ruled by Emperor Charles V until he abdicated in January 1556 and divided his possessions. The lands of the Habsburg monarchy, often referred to as "Austria", went to his brother Ferdinand, who was also elected Holy Roman Emperor. His son Philip II of Spain was already ruler of the Spanish Netherlands, Milan and joint ruler of England through his marriage to Mary I in July 1554. He now became king of Spain, Naples, Sicily and its colonial possessions in South America.

The peace was facilitated by the abdication of Charles V in 1556 and the division of the Habsburg empire between Spain and Austria: Philip II of Spain received the kingdoms of Spain, Naples, Sicily, and Sardinia, as well as the territories in the Americas; and Ferdinand of Austria became ruler of the Holy Roman Empire extending from Germany to northern Italy, with suo jure control of the Danube monarchy. The Duchy of Milan and the Habsburg Netherlands were left in personal union to the King of Spain but continued to be part of the Holy Roman Empire. With the end of the personal union of the Holy Roman Empire and Spain ("Habsburg encirclement"), France was open to peace talks. A truce was reached in Vaucelles around 1556 but was broken shortly after. The condition of economic and religious turmoil in which the war resumed forced the parties to make peace in 1559.

This division reflected the administrative complexity of managing the two empires as a single entity but also differences in their strategic objectives. While Spain was a global maritime superpower, the Austrian Habsburgs focused on securing a pre-eminent position in Germany and managing the threat posed by the Ottoman Empire. A second area of divergence was how to respond to the Reformation and growth of Protestantism. In Germany, conflict between Lutheran and Catholic princes resulted in the 1552 Second Schmalkaldic War, settled by the 1556 Peace of Augsburg. Unlike Ferdinand, who favoured compromise with his Protestant subjects, Charles and his son Philip responded to the simultaneous rise of Calvinism in the Spanish Netherlands with repression, a policy that eventually led to the outbreak of the Dutch War of Independence in 1568. 

The two Habsburg branches continued to co-operate when their aims converged, not least because the Spanish army relied on German recruits. However, Ferdinand focused on restoring order to the Empire and dealing with the threat posed by the Ottoman occupation of Hungary. Although Philip continued fighting, peace with France would enable him to deal with the rebellious Dutch while victories at St Quentin in 1557 and Gravelines in August 1558 allowed him to negotiate from strength. Like his opponents, he was struggling to finance the war; in December 1558, he advised his commander in Flanders, Emmanuel Philibert, Duke of Savoy, that he could no longer pay his troops.    

Similar financial problems meant Henry II of France was also willing to reach an agreement. Faced by Habsburg territories on three of their frontiers (see Map), French objectives were to strengthen their borders and weaken their opponents. The former had been achieved by the occupation of the Three Bishoprics in 1552 and capture of Calais in January 1558, while dividing the Habsburg lands between Spain and Austria went some way to achieving the latter. In addition, internal divisions caused by the rise of Protestantism in France had exacerbated regional differences and factional splits within the nobility which led to the outbreak of the French Wars of Religion in 1562. England was also anxious to end the war, which it entered in alliance with Spain and was widely seen as a disastrous decision. The capture of Calais after more than 200 years severely damaged English prestige and deprived them of a bridgehead which had allowed English troops to intervene in mainland Europe with relative ease.

Negotiations

Marck and Vaucelles 
After three years of war, both the French and Spanish courts were making overtures for peace talks as early as November 1554. The first serious Franco-Spanish peace negotiations, although preliminary, were held at the Conference of Marck within the Pale of Calais – on then-neutral English soil – in June 1555. However, both sides made mistakes and the conference was a failure; they wanted peace, but were not ready for reconciliation yet. The failure caused both kings to desire revenge, but as their armies and finances were exhausted, they remained on the defensive and the military situation barely changed. By October 1555, diplomacy had resumed, and the Truce of Vaucelles was agreed on 5 February 1556, somewhat favourable to France. But rather than a step towards peace, Vaucelles proved to be but a lull in the war; continued desire for revenge led to numerous incidents during the negotiations, and the stipulations of the truce were never fully implemented and observed before war resumed in September 1556 with the Spanish invasion of the pro-French Papal States. 

Initially, there were attempts on both sides to limit the conflict to the Papal States, but by December 1556, preparations were made for a resumption of hostilities on all fronts, and on 6 January 1557 Gaspard II de Coligny (French governor of Picardy) launched surprise attacks on Douai and Lens in the Spanish Netherlands. The Spanish victory in the Battle of St. Quentin (1557) (10–27 August) turned out to be decisive; while England had entered the war on Spain's side, France lost one ally after the other, including the Pope, who signed a separate peace on 12 September 1557. However, Henry managed to surprise friend and foe by conquering Calais in January 1558, and negotiated a marriage between Mary, Queen of Scots and his son Francis (19 April 1558); although not quite able to make up for his loss at St. Quentin, it allowed Henry to save face and obtain a better position at the negotiation table.

Marcoing 
Although peace talks between Spain, England and France began in early 1558, little progress was made since France refused to contemplate Mary's demand for the return of Calais and her marriage to Philip made it difficult for England to negotiate separately. The Franco-Spanish talks at Marcoing near Cambrai, initiated by France, lasted just three days (15–17 May 1558) and came to nothing, mostly because the Siege of Thionville (1558) was ongoing, Granvelle sought to gain time by negotiations in order to allow the Spanish army in the Netherlands to prepare for war, and both parties could not find diplomatic common ground.

Cercamp and Cateau 

 Presiding negotiator: Christina of Denmark, former Duchess consort of Lorraine (1544–1545)
 Chief Spanish negotiator: Antoine Perrenot de Granvelle
 Other Spanish negotiators: Fernando Álvarez de Toledo, 3rd Duke of Alba; William I, Prince of Orange; Ruy Gómez de Silva, 1st Prince of Éboli
 Chief French negotiator: Anne de Montmorency
 Other French negotiators: Jacques d'Albon, Marquis of Fronsac; Charles de Guise, Cardinal of Lorraine; Jean de Morvilliers, bishop of Orléans; and the French secretary of state Claude de l'Aubespine
 Chief English negotiator: Henry Fitzalan, 12th Earl of Arundel
 Other English negotiators: Thomas Thirlby, bishop of Ely; Nicholas Wotton, the dean of Canterbury and York; and William Howard, 1st Baron Howard of Effingham
 Ambassadors of other states not directly involved in the negotiations were not permitted to attend; this especially disadvantaged Italian states, because decisions about their futures were made.

Haan (2010) concluded that the negotiations from October 1558 to April 1559 focused on three major unresolved issues:
 The fate of the Pale of Calais (owned by England, but occupied by France).
 The fate of the territories in the north-west of Italy (i.e. Piedmont, Montferrat and the Duchy of Milan).
 The restitution of the places of Picardy (mainly St. Quentin, Le Catelet and Ham, owned by France, but occupied by Spain).

The last two rounds of peace talks that eventually led to the Treaty of Cateau-Cambrésis began at the Cistercian monastery of Cercamp near Frévent (12 October – 26 November 1558), followed by Le Cateau-Cambrésis (10 February – 3 April 1559). Large formal meetings were held in Christina's lodgings, while informal talks were held in the diplomats' own quarters or on their way to meals. On 17 October, the Spanish and French agreed to an armistice for the remainder of that month of October. On 1 December 1558, the parties at Cercamp agreed to renew the ceasefire '...as it was first agreed on the 17th day of last October, as is said, until midnight of the last day of next January...', and on 6 February 1559 at Le Cateau-Cambrésis they prolonged the truce (then set to expire on 10 February) indefinitely 'for all the time that they are in this Negotiation, and six days after the separation of this Assembly...'.

The French plenipotentiaries intended to recover St. Quentin, Le Catelet and Ham, to keep Calais, and to maintain solid positions in northern Italy; they were willing to surrender the Duchy Milan for proper compensation, and to compromise in the Duchy of Savoy as long as it left France with a couple of strong fortified places. The Spanish delegates demanded that Henry II abandoned all his (claimed) possessions in Italy (Piedmont, Corsica, the Republic of Siena, and part of Montferrat), and they used the Spanish-occupied places in Picardy as bargaining material to achieve this goal. Emmanuel Philibert stated he was willing to surrender only four places to France, and otherwise reclaim the entire Savoyard territory for himself. The English and French made equally categorical claims to legitimate possession of Calais, and the Spanish were determined to support their English allies as long as it would not lead them to fail to achieve peace with France.

Mary's death in November 1558 and the succession of her Protestant half-sister Elizabeth I of England changed the Anglo-French dynamic. The new regime needed peace and stability more than Calais, while France had leverage in the form of the 16 year old Catholic wife of the future Francis II of France, Mary, Queen of Scots, who also had a claim to the English throne. This opened the possibility of a separate Anglo-French peace and in December a new English envoy, Nicholas Wotton, arrived in France to hold informal talks separate from those in Le Cateau. Since both sides recognised English security depended upon Philip's continued goodwill, finding a way to address this issue was crucial if they were to reach a deal. Although Elizabeth continued to press for the return of Calais, she could not afford to continue fighting simply to achieve that objective and the French were well aware of that reality.

Despite attempts to keep the negotiations secret, his spies kept Philip informed on their progress; although he disliked Elizabeth's religion, having the half-French Mary on the English throne would be far worse, even if she was a Catholic. If England was about to settle, it was vital that Spain should not be left isolated, especially as Philip admitted in February that his desperate financial position made it a matter of urgency. While its involvement in the war was relatively minor, England played an important role in the negotiations that ended it, as did Emperor Ferdinand, whose approval was required since many of the territorial adjustments involved states that were members of the Holy Roman Empire. A preliminary peace treaty between France and Scotland on the one hand and England on the other was agreed on 12 March 1559 at Cateau-Cambrésis.

Terms
Bertrand Haan (2010) stated that, until his publication, 'the various acts making up the Treaty of Cateau-Cambrésis have never been the subject of a scientific edition made from original documents,' pointing out that Jean Dumont's Corps universel diplomatique (1728) 'remains a reference, but is based on later copies.' Haan's 2010 edition of the Franco-Spanish agreement is based on 16th-century copies and collations (the articles in the original treaties appear to have been untitled and unnumbered), as he had no access to the originals. He also included several documents accompanying the main treaty: 'a traité des particuliers concerning lands, territorial claims or the pardon of prelates, great lords and financiers', a declaration that Christoph von Roggendorf and Juan de Luna would be excluded from the treaty, and a prisoner exchange agreement between Montmorency and Alba. He decided not to publish the Anglo-French agreement, pointing out that the original copies of it have been preserved as "J 652, n° 32" in the Trésor des Chartes of the Archives Nationales and as "E 30/1123" in the "Exchequer (Treasury of Receipts)" of the Public Record Office (now The National Archives).
 2 April 1559: Anglo-French treaty between queen Elizabeth I and king Henry II
 2 April 1559: Anglo-Scottish treaty between queen Elizabeth I and Mary, Queen of Scots & the later Francis II of France
 (related) 5 July 1560: Treaty of Edinburgh between Elizabeth I and Mary, Queen of Scots & Francis II of France
 3 April 1559: Franco-Spanish treaty between kings Henry II and Philip II
 3 April 1559: Franco-Spanish traité des particuliers
 3 April 1559: Declaration excluding Roggendorf and Luna (3 April 1559)
 3 April 1559: Prisoner exchange agreement between Montmorency and Alba (3 April 1559).

Franco-Spanish agreement

 Henry II of France recognised Philip II of Spain as ruler of Milan and Naples. Henry II of France renounced his hereditary claims to the Duchy of Milan (ruled by Spain and part of the Holy Roman Empire), and recognized Spanish control over the Kingdom of Naples, the Kingdom of Sicily, and the Kingdom of Sardinia.
 Henry and Philip agreed to bring about 'the convocation and celebration of a holy universal council, so necessary for the reformation and reduction of the whole Christian Church into a true unity and harmony'. (Article 2)
 Spain returned Saint Quentin, Ham, Le Catelet and other places in northern France taken during the war. (Article 11)
 Henry confirmed Charles V's 1536 transfer of the March of Montferrat to the Duchy of Mantua, ruled by Guglielmo Gonzaga (allied with Spain and part of the Holy Roman Empire). (Articles 21–22)
 France returned the island of Corsica to the Republic of Genoa (allied with Spain and part of the Holy Roman Empire). French and Genoese merchants were granted full access to each other's ports. (Article 24) 
 France recognised the 1555 conquest of the Republic of Siena (allied with France) by the Republic of Florence (allied with Spain and part of the Holy Roman Empire) and ceded the Presidi to Philip of Spain. (Article 25)
 As part of the terms, Emmanuel Philibert, Duke of Savoy married Henry's sister Margaret of France, Duchess of Berry (1523–1574), while his eldest daughter Elisabeth of Valois (1545–1568) became Philip's third wife. (Articles 26–33)
 France withdrew from Piedmont and gave the Duchy of Savoy–Piedmont (allied with Spain and part of the Holy Roman Empire) back to Emmanuel Philibert, Duke of Savoy due to his victory at St. Quentin. Emmanuel Philibert agreed to remain neutral in the event of future conflict. (Articles 33 to 43)
 France retained five fortresses in northern Italy: near Turin ("Thurin"), Cherasco ("Quiers"), Pinerolo (Pignerol, "Pinerol"), Chivasso ("Chivaz") and Villanova d'Asti ("Villeneufve d'Ast"). (Article 34)   
 France retained the Three Bishoprics of Toul, Metz, and Verdun, ceded by Maurice, Elector of Saxony for Henry's support during the Second Schmalkaldic War in 1552. (Article 44)

Anglo-French agreement 

 (Articles 7, 8 and 14) England granted France possession of the Pale of Calais (seized from England in 1558), for an initial period of eight years (Article 7); this was a mechanism to save face and although Elizabeth tried to take advantage of the civil war to negotiate its return in 1562, it remained French thereafter.

Consequences

Celebrations 

Emmanuel Philibert, Duke of Savoy married Margaret of France, Duchess of Berry, the sister of Henry II of France. Philip II of Spain married Elisabeth, the daughter of Henry II of France. Often overlooked, this has been described as "the most important marriage treaty of the 16th century". During a tournament held to celebrate the peace on 1 July, king Henry was injured in a jousting accident when a sliver from the shattered lance of Gabriel Montgomery, captain of the Scottish Guard at the French Court, pierced his eye and entered his brain. He died ten days later on 10 July 1559. His 15-year-old son Francis II succeeded him before he too died in December 1560 and was replaced by his 10-year-old brother Charles. The resulting political instability, combined with the sudden demobilisation of thousands of largely unpaid troops, led to the outbreak of the French Wars of Religion in 1562 that would consume France for the next thirty years.

Territories and dynasties 

By the terms of the treaties, France ended military operations in the Spanish Netherlands and the Imperial fiefs of northern Italy and brought an end to most of the French occupation in Corsica, Tuscany and Piedmont. England and the Habsburgs, in exchange, ended their opposition to French occupation of the Pale of Calais, the Three Bishoprics and a number of fortresses. For Spain, despite no new gains and the restoration of some occupied territories to France, the peace was a positive result by confirming its control of the Habsburg Netherlands, the Duchy of Milan, and the Kingdoms of Sardinia, Naples, and Sicily. Ferdinand I left the Three Bishoprics under French occupation, but the Netherlands and most of northern Italy remained part of the Holy Roman Empire in the form of imperial fiefs. Furthermore, his position of Holy Roman Emperor was recognized by the Pope, who had refused to do so as long as the war between France and the Habsburgs continued. England fared poorly during the war, and the loss of its last stronghold on the Continent damaged its reputation.

At the end of the conflict, Italy was therefore divided between viceroyalties of the Spanish Habsburgs in the south and the formal fiefs of the Austrian Habsburgs in the north. The imperial states were ruled by the Medici in Tuscany, the Spanish Habsburgs in Milan, the Estensi in Modena, and the House of Savoy in Piedmont (which moved its capital to Turin in 1562). The Kingdoms of Naples, Sicily and Sardinia were under direct rule of the Spanish Habsburgs. The situation continued until the European wars of succession of the 18th century, when northern Italy passed to the Austrian house of Habsburg-Lorraine, and southern Italy passed to the Spanish Bourbons. The Treaty of Cateau-Cambrésis, by bringing Italy into a long period of peace and economic stability (which critics call stagnation) marks the end of the Italian Renaissance and the transition to the Baroque (Vivaldi, Bernini, Caravaggio,... but also Vico, Bruno, Galileo).

Religion 
Some historians have claimed that all signatories of the treaty needed to 'purge their lands of heresy'; in other words, all their subjects had to be forcefully reverted to Catholicism. Visconti (2003), for example, claimed that when pressured by Spain to implement this obligation, Emmanuel Philibert, Duke of Savoy proclaimed the Edict of Nice (15 February 1560), prohibiting Protestantism on pains of a large fine, enslavement or banishment, which soon led to an armed revolt by the Protestant Waldensians in his domain that would last until July 1561. However, modern historians disagree about the primary motives of Philip II of Spain and especially Henry II of France to conclude this peace treaty. Because Henry II had told the Parliament of Paris that the fight against heresy required all his strength and thus he needed to establish peace with Spain, Lucien Romier (1910) argued that, besides the great financial troubles, 'that the religious motive of Henry had great, if not decisive, weight'. According to Rainer Babel (2021), this was 'a judgement which later research, with some nuances in detail, has not refuted', stating however that Bertrand Haan (2010) had 'a deviating interpretation' challenging this consensus. Haan (2010) argued that finances were more important than domestic religious dissension; the fact that the latter were prominent in the 1560s in both France and Spain may have led historians astray in emphasising the role of religion in the 1559 treaty. Megan Williams (2011) summarised: 'Indeed, Haan contends, it was not the treaty itself but its subsequent justifications which stoked French religious strife. The treaty's priority, he argues, was not a Catholic alliance to extirpate heresy but the affirmation of its signatories' honor and amity, consecrated by a set of dynastic marriages.' According to Haan, there is no evidence of a Catholic alliance between France and Spain to eradicate Protestantism, even though some contemporaries have pointed to the treaty's second article to argue such an agreement existed: 'The second article expresses the wish to convene an oecumenical council. People, the contemporaries first, have concluded that the agreement sealed the establishment of a united front of Philip II and Henry II against Protestantism in their states as in Europe. The analysis of the progress of the talks shows that this was not the case.'

Pope Pius V raised the Florentine duke Cosimo de' Medici to Grand Duke of Tuscany in 1569, which was confirmed by the emperor, although Philip II of Spain disapproved. Although the Papacy's diplomatic role increased during the Wars of Religion, popes and papal legates played no role in negotiating the most significant truces and treaties between the Habsburg and Valois monarchs during these wars.

Notes

References

Bibliography

External link 
 Photocopies of the Franco-Spanish Treaty of Cateau-Cambresis in the original Spanish text – ieg-friedensvertraege.de Leibniz Institute for European History

1559 in England
1559 in Italy
1559 in France
1559 in Spain
1559 in the Holy Roman Empire
Cateau-Cambrésis
Cateau-Cambrésis
Cateau-Cambrésis
Cateau-Cambrésis
Henry II of France
Ferdinand I, Holy Roman Emperor
Philip II of Spain
Elizabeth I
Italian War of 1551–1559